The discography of Swedish pop music group ABBA consists of nine studio albums, two live albums, seven compilation albums, four box sets, five video albums, 50 singles, and 43 music videos. To date, ABBA has sold 150 million records worldwide becoming one of the best-selling music artists in history. They have scored 9 No. 1 singles and 10 No. 1 albums in the UK, becoming the most successful Swedish act of all time on the Official Charts.

ABBA's biggest hit singles worldwide are "Dancing Queen" and "Fernando", with Arrival being their biggest hit studio album.

The compilation album Gold: Greatest Hits (1992) is the second best-selling album of all time in the UK and has sold over 30 million copies worldwide.

The members of ABBA are Agnetha Fältskog, Anni-Frid Lyngstad (better known as Frida), Benny Andersson, and Björn Ulvaeus.

Albums

Studio albums

Compilation albums

Other compilation albums

Live albums

Box sets

Singles

Notes

Singles released exclusively

The pre-ABBA songs "Hej Gamle Man", "Tänk Om Jorden Vore Ung", "She's My Kind of Girl", "Det Kan Ingen Doktor Hjälpa", "En karusell/En Carousel" and "Love Has Its Ways" were released in Sweden and/or Japan as singles (1970–1972). These songs were released officially as singles by Björn & Benny, but some featured vocal contributions from both Agnetha Fältskog and Annifrid Lyngstad. The German version of "Hej Gamle Man" ("Hey Musikant") was released as a single in Germany (1971), while France saw a release of "Inga Theme" as a single in 1971.

"En Sång Och En Saga" was released as an Agnetha Fältskog solo single in Sweden (1970). It features the remaining ABBA-members as vocalists.

"En hälsning till våra parkarrangörer" was released as a promo single (1972) in order promote ABBA's then-upcoming tour of the Swedish "Folk Parks". This track was in fact a series of snippets of then well-known ABBA-songs and solo-songs with a spoken overdub featuring all of the ABBA-members. It was officially released as part of the Deluxe Edition of the album "Ring Ring" released in 2013.

"I Am Just a Girl" was released in Japan in 1973. The song was a B-side "Love Isn't Easy (But It Sure Is Hard Enough)" everywhere else.

The Spanish version of "Chiquitita" was widely released—throughout South America as well as in Australia, Austria, Canada, France, Germany, South Africa, Spain, and USA. The Spanish versions of "Andante, Andante", "Thank You for the Music" ("Gracias Por La Música"), "I Have a Dream" ("Estoy Soñando"), "Happy New Year" ("Felicidad"), "When All Is Said and Done" ("No Hay a Quien Culpar"), "Slipping Through My Fingers" ("Se Me Está Escapando"), "Fernando", "Hasta Mañana", and "Gimme! Gimme! Gimme! (A Man After Midnight)" ("Dame! Dame! Dame!") were released as singles in various Spanish-speaking countries—primarily in Spain and South America—as well as some in Japan and USA (1979–1981).

See also "Non-English releases" and "Other releases" for chart positions.

Promo releases

Reissues

Notes

 A^ "Dancing Queen", "Voulez-Vous" and "Thank You for the Music" were reissues of the original songs to promote the 1992 compilation ABBA Gold.
 B^ "Summer Night City" was released to promote the 1993 compilation More ABBA Gold: More ABBA Hits.
 C^ "SOS" was reissued as a double A-side single with "Chiquitita" to promote the Japan-only compilation SOS: The Best of ABBA. The song has sold more than 130,000 copies and became the best-selling single of 2001 performed by a Western artist in Japan.
 D^ "Waterloo" was a reissue of the original song to promote the 2004 reissue of Waterloo as a 30th Anniversary Edition.
 E^ "Happy New Year" peaked at number 25 on the Danish singles chart upon its reissue in 2008.
 F^ "Mamma Mia", "Dancing Queen" and "Honey, Honey" were reissued due to the popularity of Mamma Mia! The Movie.

Other charted songs 

Notes

Other appearances

Videography

Video albums

 The LaserDisc version of ABBA In Concert was released in 1990 without the Bonus Material.

Music videos

“Film clips” showing groups performing their songs had been used to great effect by major artists like The Beatles since the mid-Sixties as a convenience for those who were
reluctant or unable to tour or make appearances abroad. In the summer of 1974, when there was a demand for the group's presence in the United States, they hired the director Lasse Hallström to direct the group's first film clips, for ‘Waterloo’ and ‘Ring Ring’. Hallström had been making pop film clips for television since the late Sixties, and had recently directed a sequence of successful short comedy skits for Swedish television. The videos were successful, and the following year the group rehired him to make four promo clips of the songs they felt had the strongest hit potential on the new album (‘I Do, I Do, I Do, I Do, I Do’, ‘Mamma Mia’, ‘SOS’ and ‘Bang-A-Boomerang’). Hallström would go on to make most of their in-house promotional clips, often on a very small budget (the four 1975 films were completed in two days, at a total cost of less than 50,000 kronor (£5,500), and Hallström did the editing work himself from his apartment). The relationship ended in 1982, prompted by changing tastes and demands and complaints from ABBA's distributors that Hallström's low-budget approach made it difficult to market the band. Director Kjell Sundvall and cinematographer Kjell-Åke Andersson, an up-and-coming filmmaker team, were hired to replace them for the final two promotional videos, 'The Day Before You Came' and 'Under Attack'.

Labels
 Atlantic
 RCA Records owned by Sony Music Entertainment
 Universal Music Australia.

See also
 Agnetha Fältskog discography
 Anni-Frid Lyngstad discography
 Benny Andersson discography
 
 Mamma Mia! (musical)
 Mamma Mia! (film)
 Mamma Mia! The Movie Soundtrack
 List of songs recorded by ABBA
 List of unreleased songs recorded by ABBA
 List of best-selling music artists
 List of best-selling albums

References
Specific

General

External links
 ABBASite.com — official website.
 
 ABBA Record Sales

Discography
Disco discographies
Discographies of Swedish artists
Pop music group discographies